Marillenknödel (lit. apricot dumplings) is a pastry common in Austrian (especially Viennese) and Czech cuisine. Marillen is the Austro-Bavarian term for apricots (most of the German-speaking world uses 	Aprikose) and this pastry is found predominantly in areas where apricot orchards are common, such as the Wachau and Vinschgau regions.

Small dumplings (Knödel) are formed from dough, in which cored apricots or mirabelle plums are placed. The dumplings are then boiled in slightly salted water and covered in crispily fried bread crumbs and powdered sugar. The dough is usually made of potato (Erdapfel), though also quark (Topfen) and choux pastry are used.

Today, Marillenknödel are also offered as frozen ready meals. At the Kurt Tichy ice cream parlor in Vienna one can also find Eismarillenknödel, in which the "dough" is made of ice cream and the crumbs are made of a nut and sugar mixture.

Ferdinand I of Austria famously ordered Marillenknödel when apricots were out of season, to which he replied, "I am the Emperor and I want dumplings!"

See also
Knedle
List of dumplings

References

Austrian pastries
Czech cuisine
Fruit dishes
Dumplings
Ferdinand I of Austria